In algebraic geometry, the sinusoidal spirals are a family of curves defined by the equation in polar coordinates

With a rotation about the origin, this can also be written

The term "spiral" is a misnomer, because they are not actually spirals, and often have a flower-like shape. Many well known curves are sinusoidal spirals including:
 Rectangular hyperbola
 Line
 Parabola
 Tschirnhausen cubic 
 Cayley's sextet
 Cardioid
 Circle
 Lemniscate of Bernoulli

The curves were first studied by Colin Maclaurin.

Equations
Differentiating

and eliminating a produces a differential equation for r and θ:
.

Then
 
which implies that the polar tangential angle is 
 
and so the tangential angle is 
.
(The sign here is positive if r and cos nθ have the same sign and negative otherwise.)

The unit tangent vector,
,
has length one, so comparing the magnitude of the vectors on each side of the above equation gives
.
In particular, the length of a single loop when  is:

The curvature is given by
.

Properties
The inverse of a sinusoidal spiral with respect to a circle with center at the origin is another sinusoidal spiral whose value of n is the negative of the original curve's value of n. For example, the inverse of the lemniscate of Bernoulli is a rectangular hyperbola.

The isoptic, pedal and negative pedal of a sinusoidal spiral are different sinusoidal spirals.

One path of a particle moving according to a central force proportional to a power of r is a sinusoidal spiral.

When n is an integer, and n points are arranged regularly on a circle of radius a, then the set of points so that the geometric mean of the distances from the point to the n points is a sinusoidal spiral. In this case the sinusoidal spiral is a polynomial lemniscate.

References
Yates, R. C.: A Handbook on Curves and Their Properties, J. W. Edwards (1952), "Spiral" p. 213–214
"Sinusoidal spiral" at www.2dcurves.com
"Sinusoidal Spirals" at The MacTutor History of Mathematics

Plane curves
Algebraic curves